Tepko is a locality in the Murray Mallee between the Mount Lofty Ranges and the Murray River in South Australia.

Tepko was a station on the now-closed Sedan railway line. Its name is derived from an Aboriginal name for a hill. It spans the boundary between the Mid Murray Council and the Rural City of Murray Bridge.

A $750 million power plant was proposed in 2010 for the area, though was never built.

References